Aktyubinsky (Aqtübä) is an urban locality (an urban-type settlement) in Aznakayevsky District of the Republic of Tatarstan, Russia, located on the Leninogorsk–Aznakayevo auto route,  west of Aznakayevo. As of the 2010 Census, its population was 9,237.

History
It was established on July 5, 1956 and was granted urban-type settlement status on August 27, 1956.

Administrative and municipal status
Within the framework of administrative divisions, the urban-type settlement of Aktyubinsky is subordinated to Aznakayevsky District. As a municipal division, Aktyubinsky is incorporated within Aznakayevsky Municipal District as Aktyubinsky Urban Settlement.

Economy
As of 1997, industrial enterprises in Aktyubinsky included an oil extracting plant, a bakery, and a logging company.

Demographics

As of the 1989 Census, the population was mostly Tatar (57.9%) and Russian (35.6%). Other ethnicities of note included Ukrainians (1.9%), Chuvash (1.8%), and Mordvins (1.2%).

References

Notes

Sources

Urban-type settlements in the Republic of Tatarstan